WNAT (Jam'n 106.3 1450 AM) is a radio station licensed to serve the community of Natchez, Mississippi. The station is owned by Listen Up Yall Media and airs a rhythmic AC format.

The station was assigned the WNAT call letters by the Federal Communications Commission on May 5, 1949.

On November 25, 2019, WNAT changed their format from news/talk to rhythmic adult contemporary, branded as "Jam'n 106.3".

References

External links
FCC Public Inspection File for WNAT
FCC History Card for WNAT

NAT
Radio stations established in 1949
1949 establishments in the United States
Adams County, Mississippi
Rhythmic adult contemporary radio stations